The Mystery of Mr. Bernard Brown may refer to:

 The Mystery of Mr. Bernard Brown (novel), an 1896 novel by E. Phillips Oppenheim
 The Mystery of Mr. Bernard Brown (film), a 1921 film adaptation directed by Sinclair Hill